Gongabu is a village and former Village Development Committee that is now part of Tokha Municipality in Kathmandu District in Province No. 3 of central Nepal. At the time of the 2011 Nepal census it had a population of 54,410 and had 14,456 households in it in an area just 270 hectares in size

References

Populated places in Kathmandu District